Zdanów  is a village in the administrative district of Gmina Drawno, within Choszczno County, West Pomeranian Voivodeship, in north-western Poland.

The village has a population of 40.

Before 1945 the village was German-settled and part of Germany.

References

Villages in Choszczno County